The 2020 All-Big 12 Conference football team consists of American football players chosen as All-Big 12 Conference players for the 2020 Big 12 Conference football season.  The conference recognizes two official All-Big 12 selectors: (1) the Big 12 conference coaches selected separate offensive and defensive units and named first- and second-team players (the "Coaches" team); and (2) a panel of sports writers and broadcasters covering the Big 12 also selected offensive and defensive units and named first- and second-team players (the "Media" team).

Offensive selections

Quarterbacks

 Sam Ehlinger, Texas (Coaches-2)
 Brock Purdy, Iowa State (Coaches-1; Media-2)
 Spencer Rattler, Oklahoma (Media-1)

Running backs

 Leddie Brown, West Virginia (Coaches-1; Media-1)
 Breece Hall, Iowa State (Coaches-1; Media-1)
 Chuba Hubbard, Oklahoma State (Coaches-2; Media-2)

Fullbacks

 Jeremiah Hall, Oklahoma (Coaches-1)
 Briley Moore, Kansas State (Coaches-2)

Centers

 Creed Humphrey, Oklahoma (Coaches-1; Media-1)
 Colin Newell, Iowa State (Coaches-1; Media-2)

Guards

 Jack Anderson, Texas Tech (Coaches-1; Media-1)
 Michael Brown, West Virginia (Coaches-2; Media-2)
 Derek Schweiger, Iowa State (Coaches-2; Media-2)
 Josh Sills, Oklahoma State (Media-1)

Tackles

 Sam Cosmi, Texas (Coaches-1; Media-1)
 Teven Jenkins, Oklahoma State (Coaches-1; Media-1)
 Dawson Deaton, Texas Tech (Coaches-2)
 Adrian Ealy, Oklahoma (Coaches-2; Media-2)
 Noah Johnson, Kansas State (Coaches-2)
 T.J. Storment, TCU (Media-2)

Tight ends

 Charlie Kolar, Iowa State (Coaches-1; Media-1)
 Chase Allen, Iowa State (Coaches-2) 
 Austin Stogner, Oklahoma (Media-2)

Receivers

 Erik Ezukanma, Texas Tech (Coaches-1; Media-1)
 Tylan Wallace, Oklahoma State (Coaches-1; Media-1)
 Xavier Hutchinson, Iowa State (Coaches-1; Media-2)
 Marvin Mims, Oklahoma (Coaches-2; Media-2)
 R. J. Sneed, Baylor (Coaches-2)
 Winston Wright Jr., West Virginia (Coaches-2)

Defensive selections

Defensive linemen
 JaQuan Bailey, Iowa State (Coaches-1; Media-1)
 Wyatt Hubert, Kansas State (Coaches-1; Media-1)
 Darius Stills, West Virginia (Coaches-1; Media-1)
 Ochaun Mathis, TCU (Coaches-2; Media-2)
 Akheem Mesidor, West Virginia (Coaches-2)
 Will McDonald IV, Iowa State (Coaches-1; Media-2)
 Joseph Ossai, Texas (Coaches-1; Media-2)
 Ronnie Perkins, Oklahoma (Coaches-2)
 Dante Stills, West Virginia (Media-2)
 Isaiah Thomas, Oklahoma (Coaches-2; Media-1)
 Drew Wiley, Kansas State (Media-2)
 Perrion Winfrey, Oklahoma (Coaches-2)

Linebackers

 Tony Fields II, West Virginia (Coaches-1; Media-1)
 Mike Rose, Iowa State (Coaches-1; Media-1)
 Garret Wallow, TCU (Coaches-1; Media-1)
 Terrel Bernard, Baylor (Coaches-2; Media-2)
 Nik Bonitto, Oklahoma (Media-2)
 Amen Ogbongbemiga, Oklahoma State (Coaches-2; Media-2)
 Malcolm Rodriguez, Oklahoma State (Coaches-2)

Defensive backs

 Tre'Vius Hodges-Tomlinson, TCU (Coaches-1; Media-1)
 Trevon Moehrig, TCU (Coaches-1; Media-1)
 Jalen Pitre, Baylor (Coaches-1; Media-1)
 Zech McPhearson, Texas Tech (Coaches-1; Media-1)
 Greg Eisworth, Iowa State (Coaches-1; Media-2)
 Tre Brown, Oklahoma (Coaches-2; Media-2)
 Rodarius Williams, Oklahoma State (Coaches-2; Media-2)
 Alonzo Addae, West Virginia (Coaches-2)
 Chris Brown, Texas (Coaches-2)
 Kolby Harvell-Peel, Oklahoma State (Coaches-2)
 Tykee Smith, West Virginia (Media-2)

Special teams

Kickers

 Gabe Brkic, Oklahoma (Coaches-1; Media-1)
 Cameron Dicker, Texas (Coaches-2; Media-2)

Punters

 Austin McNamara, Texas Tech (Coaches-1; Media-1)
 Jordy Sandy, TCU (Coaches-2; Media-2)

All-purpose / Return specialists

 Phillip Brooks, Kansas State (Coaches-1)
 Trestan Ebner, Baylor (Coaches-2; Media-1)
 Deuce Vaughn, Kansas State (Media-2)

Key
Bold = selected as a first-team player by both the coaches and media panel

Coaches = selected by Big 12 Conference coaches

Media = selected by a media panel

See also
2020 College Football All-America Team

References

All-Big 12 Conference
All-Big 12 Conference football teams